Norbert Pieter Marie Klein (1 March 1956 – 31 August 2021) was a Dutch politician. As a member of 50PLUS he was an MP between 20 September 2012 and 23 March 2017. He left 50PLUS in 2014 and continued as an independent. As a member of the People's Party for Freedom and Democracy (VVD) he was a member of the municipal council of Nijmegen from 1982 to 1989, and a member of the States-Provincial of Gelderland from 1991 to 2003. In 2006, he left the VVD.

In 2005, he was chairman ad int. of Dutch public broadcasting association AVRO.

Klein was born in Hengelo and studied law at Radboud University Nijmegen. He resided in Hoevelaken until his death, aged 65, in 2021.

References

External links 
  Parlement.com biography

1956 births
2021 deaths
50PLUS politicians
Dutch corporate directors
Dutch political party founders
Members of the House of Representatives (Netherlands)
Members of the Provincial Council of Gelderland
Municipal councillors of Nijmegen
Independent politicians in the Netherlands
People from Nijkerk
People from Nijmegen
People's Party for Freedom and Democracy politicians
Radboud University Nijmegen alumni
21st-century Dutch politicians